The 1908–09 Hong Kong Football League was the inaugural season of Hong Kong Football League, also recognized as the inaugural season of Hong Kong First Division.

League table

References

1908–09 Hong Kong First Division table (RSSSF)

1908-09
1908–09 domestic association football leagues
1908 in Hong Kong
1909 in Hong Kong